The 1956 Argentine Primera División was the 65th season of top-flight football in Argentina. The season began on April 15 and ended on December 2.

River Plate achieved its 13th league title.

League standings

References

Argentine Primera División seasons
Argentine Primera Division
Primera Division